
Gmina Kalwaria Zebrzydowska is an urban-rural gmina (administrative district) in Wadowice County, Lesser Poland Voivodeship, in southern Poland.

Villages
Apart from the town of Kalwaria Zebrzydowska, Gmina Kalwaria Zebrzydowska contains the villages and settlements of Barwałd Górny, Barwałd Średni, Brody, Bugaj, Leńcze, Podolany, Przytkowice, Stanisław Dolny, Zarzyce Małe, Zarzyce Wielkie and Zebrzydowice.

Neighbouring gminas
Gmina Kalwaria Zebrzydowska is bordered by the gminas of Brzeźnica, Lanckorona, Skawina, Stryszów and Wadowice.

References
Polish official population figures 2006

Kalwaria Zebrzydowska
Wadowice County